Horacio Campi (born 26 November 1917) was an Argentine sailor. He competed in the Dragon event at the 1952 Summer Olympics.

References

External links
 

1917 births
Possibly living people
Argentine male sailors (sport)
Olympic sailors of Argentina
Sailors at the 1952 Summer Olympics – Dragon
Place of birth missing (living people)